The Party is a 1968 American comedy film directed by Blake Edwards, and starring Peter Sellers and Claudine Longet. The film has a very loose structure, and essentially serves as a series of set pieces for Sellers's improvisational comedy talents. Based on a fish-out-of-water premise, the film is about a bungling actor from India, Hrundi V. Bakshi (portrayed by Sellers), who accidentally gets invited to a lavish Hollywood dinner party and "makes terrible mistakes based upon ignorance of Western ways".

The protagonist Hrundi Bakshi was influenced by two of Sellers' earlier characters: the Indian doctor Ahmed el Kabir in The Millionairess (1960) and Inspector Clouseau in The Pink Panther series. In turn, the character Hrundi Bakshi went on to be influential, inspiring several later popular characters, including Amitabh Bachchan's character Arjun Singh in the 1982 Bollywood blockbuster Namak Halaal, Rowan Atkinson's character Mr. Bean in the 1990s British sitcom of the same name, and Hank Azaria's character Apu Nahasapeemapetilon in the American animated sitcom The Simpsons.

Plot
A film crew is making a Gunga Din-style costume epic. Unknown Indian actor Hrundi V. Bakshi (Peter Sellers) plays a bugler, but continues to play after repeatedly being shot and after the director (Herb Ellis) yells "cut." Hrundi accidentally blows up an enormous fort set rigged with explosives. The director fires Hrundi immediately and calls the studio head, General Fred R. Clutterbuck (J. Edward McKinley). Clutterbuck writes down Hrundi's name to blacklist him, but he inadvertently writes it on the guest list of his upcoming dinner party.

Hrundi receives his invitation and drives to the party. Upon parking his car, he steps into mud. Hrundi tries to rinse the mud off his shoe in a pool that flows through the house, but he loses his shoe. After many failures, he is reunited with his shoe served to him on a silver platter by one of the waiters.

Hrundi has awkward interactions with everyone at the party, including Clutterbuck's dog, Cookie. He meets famous Western movie actor "Wyoming Bill" Kelso (Denny Miller), who gives Hrundi an autograph. Hrundi later accidentally shoots Kelso with a toy gun, but Kelso doesn't see who did it. Hrundi feeds a caged macaw food from a container marked "Birdie Num Num" and drops the food on the floor. Hrundi at various times during the film activates a panel of electronics that control the intercom, a copy of the Manneken Pis (soaking a guest), and a retractable bar (while Clutterbuck is sitting at it). After Kelso hurts Hrundi's hand while shaking it ("My goodness, I would have been disappointed if you hadn't crushed my hand"), Hrundi sticks his hand into a bowl of crushed ice containing caviar. While waiting to wash his hand, he meets aspiring actress Michèle Monet (Claudine Longet), who came with producer C.S. Divot (Gavin MacLeod). Hrundi shakes Divot's hand, and Divot then shakes hands with other guests, passing around the fishy odor, and back to Hrundi after he has washed his hand.

At dinner, Hrundi's place setting by the kitchen door has a very low chair that puts his chin near the table. An increasingly drunk waiter, Levinson (Steve Franken), tries to serve dinner and fights with the other staff. During the main course, Hrundi's roast chicken catapults off his fork and becomes impaled on a guest's tiara. Hrundi asks Levinson to retrieve his meal, but the woman's wig comes off along with her tiara, as she obliviously engages in conversation. Levinson ends up brawling with other waiting staff, and dinner is disrupted.

Hrundi apologizes to his hosts; then needs to go to the bathroom. He wanders through the house, opening doors and barging in on various servants and guests in embarrassing situations. He ends up in the backyard, where he accidentally sets off the irrigation sprinklers. At Divot's insistence, Michèle gives an impromptu guitar performance of "Nothing to Lose" to impress the guests. Hrundi goes upstairs, where he saves Michèle from Divot's unwanted advances by dislodging Divot's toupee. Hrundi finally finds a bathroom, but he breaks the toilet, drops a painting in it, gets toilet paper everywhere, and floods the bathroom. To avoid being discovered Hrundi sneaks onto the roof and falls into the pool. Michèle leaps in to save him, but he's then coerced to drink alcohol to warm up. A Russian dance troupe arrives at the party. Upstairs, Hrundi finds Michèle crying in the next room and consoles her. Divot bursts in and demands Michèle leave with him. Michèle says no, and Divot cancels her screen test the next day. Hrundi persuades her to stay and have a good time with him. They return to the party in borrowed clothes. The party gets wilder, and Hrundi offers to retract the bar to make room for dancing. Instead, he opens a retractable floor with a pool underneath, causing guests to fall in the pool. Levinson makes more floors retract, and more guests fall in. Clutterbuck's daughter arrives with friends and a baby elephant painted with "THE WORLD IS FLAT" on its forehead and hippie slogans over its body. Hrundi takes offense and asks them to wash the elephant. The entire house is soon filled with soap bubbles.

Back at his home, Divot suddenly realizes that Hrundi is the fired actor who blew up the set, and he races back to the party. As the band plays on, Clutterbuck tries to save his suds-covered paintings. The air conditioning blows suds everywhere as the guests dance to psychedelic music, and Clutterbuck's distraught wife falls into the pool three times. Divot pulls up as the police and fire department personnel work to resolve everything. Hrundi apologizes one last time to Clutterbuck as Divot reveals who Hrundi is, but Clutterbuck accidentally chokes the headwaiter instead of Hrundi. Kelso gives Hrundi an autographed photo and Stetson hat as Hrundi and Michèle leave in Hrundi's Morgan three-wheeler car. Outside her apartment, Hrundi and Michèle appear on the verge of admitting that they have fallen for each other. Hrundi gives Michèle the hat as a keepsake, and she says he can come get it any time. Hrundi suggests he could come by next week, and she readily agrees. Hrundi smiles and drives off as his car backfires.

Cast

Cast notes
Vin Scully is uncredited and does not appear onscreen, but his voice can be heard announcing a Los Angeles Dodgers game on the kitchen radio.

Production
The Party was the only non-Pink Panther collaboration  between Sellers and Edwards. Producer Walter Mirisch knew that Sellers and Edwards were considered liabilities; in his autobiography, Mirisch wrote "Blake had achieved a reputation as a very expensive director, particularly after The Great Race." Sellers had played an Indian man (Dr. Ahmed el Kabir) in his hit film The Millionairess (1960), and another Indian physician in  The Road to Hong Kong (1962). He is mostly remembered as a similar klutz as Inspector Clouseau in The Pink Panther series.

The film started shooting in May under the title RSVP.

The film's interiors were shot on a set, at the MGM lot, though this may be a mistake as IMDb lists the Samuel Goldwyn Studios on Formosa as the correct address, likely as other Mirisch Productions, including West Side Story, were shot there as well. The original script was only 63 pages in length. Edwards later said it was the shortest script he ever shot from, and the majority of the content in the film was improvised on set.

The film draws much inspiration from the works of Jacques Tati; Bakshi arrives at the party in a Morgan three-wheeler which may suggest Monsieur Hulot's car in Monsieur Hulot's Holiday. However, it was not the same car (Salmson AL3). The entire film storyline is reminiscent of the Royal Garden restaurant sequence of Playtime, and the comedic interaction with inanimate objects and gadgets parallels several of Tati's films, especially Mon Oncle.

Soundtrack
The score of The Party was composed by Henry Mancini, including the song "Nothing to Lose". Mancini, commenting on audience reactions, noted "That's what I get for writing a nice song for a comedy. Nobody's going to hear a note of it." During a scene later in the film, the band can be heard playing "It Had Better Be Tonight (Meglio stasera)", a song Mancini composed for the first Pink Panther film. The CD originally was released on August 20, 1995 by BMG Victor.

Track listing

Side 1:
"The Party" (Vocal) 2:14
"Brunette in Yellow" 2:56
"Nothing to Lose" (Instrumental) 3:18
"Chicken Little Was Right" 2:54
"Candleleight on Crystal" 3:05
"Birdie Num-Num" 2:21
Side 2:
"Nothing to Lose" (Vocal) 2:25
"The Happy Pipers" 2:17
"Party Poop" 2:34
"Elegant" 4:44
"Wiggy" 3:02
"The Party" (Instrumental) 3:12

Reception
On review aggregator Rotten Tomatoes, the film has an approval rating of 83% based on 23 reviews, with an average score of 6.60/10.

The Party is considered a classic comedic cult film. Edwards' biographers Peter Lehman and William Luhr said, "The Party may very well be one of the most radically experimental films in Hollywood history; in fact it may be the single most radical film since D.W. Griffith's style came to dominate the American cinema." Saul Austerlitz wrote "Despite the offensiveness of Sellers's brownface routine, The Party is one of his very best films...Taking a page from Tati, this is neorealist comedy, purposefully lacking a director's guiding eye: look here, look there. The screen is crammed full of activity, and the audience's eyes are left to wander where they may."

Racial criticism
The Party has been criticized as having perpetuated brown stereotypes and using "brownface". Shane Danielson described it in The Guardian as "A comic masterpiece - yet hardly the most enlightened depiction of our subcontinental brothers. Still, propelled by Seller's insane brio, this late display of blackface provided some guilty chuckles, and at least one enduring catchphrase (the immortal 'Birdie num-num')."

However, the film was also hugely popular in India. The late Indian Prime Minister Indira Gandhi was a fan and was very fond of repeating Bakshi's line "In India we don't think who we are, we know who we are!", the character's reply to a hostile "Who do you think you are?" The character Hrundi Bakshi also inspired Amitabh Bachchan's character Arjun Singh in the 1982 Bollywood blockbuster Namak Halaal. Additionally, for his film The Alien, Indian director Satyajit Ray was planning on casting Sellers as a Marwari businessman. Ray was a fan of Sellers, and believed he could convincingly portray Indian characters based on his performances in The Party and The Millionairess. Sellers eventually pulled out of the project and the film fell apart.

See also
 List of American films of 1968
 Whitewashing in film

References

External links

 
 
 
 
 

1968 films
1968 comedy films
American slapstick comedy films
1960s English-language films
Films scored by Henry Mancini
Films about actors
Films directed by Blake Edwards
Films set in country houses
Films set in Los Angeles
United Artists films
Films with screenplays by Blake Edwards
Films about parties
1960s American films